Gerald I Trancaleon (also spelled Guiraut or, in French, Géraud Trancaléon or Tranche-Lion) (died 1020) was the Count of Armagnac from 995 until his death. He was the son and successor of Bernard I.

Gerald married Adalais, daughter of William Sánchez of Gascony and Urraca Garcés. They had:
Galdis, who inherited the viscounty of Corneilhas and married Adhemar of Polestron
Bernard, who succeeded him in Armagnac.

References

Sources

Counts of Armagnac
1020 deaths
Year of birth unknown